Federal elections were held in Germany on 14 September 1930. Despite losing ten seats, the Social Democratic Party of Germany (SPD) remained the largest party in the Reichstag, winning 143 of the 577 seats, while the Nazi Party (NSDAP) dramatically increased its number of seats from 12 to 107. The Communists also increased their parliamentary representation, gaining 23 seats and becoming the third-largest party in the Reichstag.

Background
The Social Democratic Party of Germany (SPD) had won the most votes and was the largest party in every election from 1919 to 1930. They led the coalition government between 1919–1920 and 1928–1930.

After the 1928 German federal election, a grand coalition was formed under the Social Democratic chancellor Hermann Müller. The coalition collapsed on 27 March 1930. President Hindenburg appointed Centre Party politician and academic Heinrich Brüning as chancellor, who formed a minority government.

The new government was confronted with the economic crisis caused by the Great Depression. Brüning disclosed to his associates in the German Labour Federation that his chief aim as chancellor would be to liberate the German economy from the burden of continuing to pay war reparations and foreign debt. This would require an unpopular policy of tight credit and a rollback of all wage and salary increases (an internal devaluation). The Reichstag rejected Brüning's measures within a month, who then used emergency powers to pass it anyway. The Reichstag rejected the emergency decree with 256 votes from the Social Democrats, the Communists, the German National People's Party and the Nazis. Brüning asked Hindenburg to dissolve the Reichstag, who promptly did so on 18 July 1930. New elections were held on 14 September 1930.

Electoral system
In 1930, Germany was formally a multi-party parliamentary democracy, led by President Paul von Hindenburg (1925–1934). However, beginning in March 1930, Hindenburg only appointed governments without a parliamentary majority which systematically governed by emergency decrees, circumventing the democratically elected Reichstag.

The electoral law awarded one seat in the Reichstag per 60,000 votes. All citizens over 21 could vote through a system of proportional representation. A new parliament was elected every four years to deal with issues related to taxes, trade, defense, etc. The President was directly elected every seven years and was primarily in control of the armed forces; however, he also had significant powers to dissolve the Reichstag, nominate a Chancellor, veto laws, and invoke article 48.

Campaign
In 1930, there were 37 individual parties running for office, only ten of which secured over 3% of the popular vote. The top six political parties participating in the 1930 election were the following:

The Nazis had increased their share of the vote in state elections since their 1928 federal election result. The SPD designated the "bourgeois block" and the Nazis as their enemies and, with the KPD, held rallies in Berlin on 1 August 1930 under the motto "Never again war". Some 30,000 participated in the SPD rally in the Lustgarten and 15,000 in the KPD demonstration at the Winterfeldtplatz. On 23 August, KPD members attacked a Nazi event in Bunzlau. Three people were killed and two seriously injured in fighting with the police. The KPD election campaign climaxed with a rally in the Berlin Sportpalast on 12 September.

Results
The 1930 German election drew a record 82% voter turnout. The Social Democratic Party of Germany (SPD) remained the strongest party and won 143 seats, a loss of 10 seats from the previous election. The National Socialist German Workers Party (NSDAP) rose to become the second-largest party with 18.25% of the vote and gained 107 seats, a massive increase from the 12 seats that had been gained in the last election. The only other major party to significantly increase its seats was the Communist Party of Germany, which won 13.13% of the vote, securing 77 seats, 23 more than in the last election. The Centre Party slightly increased their seat count by 7, equalling 68, but dropped to fourth from third place in their seat count and popular vote in comparison to the 1928 election.

The German National People's Party's (DNVP) support plummeted but managed to secure 41 seats overall. They lost 32 seats from their previously held 73, and dropped to fifth from second, chiefly due to the fragmentation of the party under Alfred Hugenberg's leadership. Due to Hugenberg's more hardline positions, moderate voters moved to the newly-formed Christian Social People's Service (CSVD), Conservative People's Party (KVP), and Christian-National Peasants' and Farmers' Party (CNBL). The German People's Party (DVP) continued to haemorrhage seats, losing 15 and only attaining 4.51% of the popular vote, ceasing to be a notable political force after the July 1932 elections. The 28 other political parties shared the remainder of the votes.

Aftermath
The 1930 election left the Social Democrats and KPD with almost 40 per cent of the seats in the Reichstag between them. In November 1931, the SPD suggested the two parties work together but Thälmann rejected the offer, with the KPD newspaper The Red Flag calling for an “intensification of the fight against Social Democracy”. Addressing the Nazi electoral breakthrough in the 1930 elections, Thälmann insisted that if Hitler came to power he was sure to fail and drive Nazi voters into the arms of the KPD. As late as February 1932, Thälmann was arguing that “Hitler must come to power first, then the requirements for a revolutionary crisis [will] arrive more quickly”.

References

Germany
Federal
Elections in the Weimar Republic
Federal elections in Germany
Germany